Baeomyces is a genus of lichenized fungi in the family Baeomycetaceae. Members of Baeomyces are commonly called cap lichens. The genus was circumscribed by German mycologist Christiaan Hendrik Persoon in 1794. Although Persoon did not designate a type species in his original description of the genus, Frederick Clements and Cornelius Lott Shear assigned Baeomyces byssoides as the type in 1931.

Species
, Species Fungorum (in the Catalogue of Life) accepts 6 species of Baeomyces.
 Baeomyces byssoides 
 Baeomyces carneus 
 Baeomyces heteromorphus 
 Baeomyces lotiformis  – China
 Baeomyces placophyllus 
 Baeomyces rufus

References

Baeomycetales
Baeomycetales genera
Lichen genera
Taxa described in 1794
Taxa named by Christiaan Hendrik Persoon